The Belgian Prayer of the Year (Belgische Speler van het Jaar in Dutch) is an annual Basketball League Belgium Division I award given to the best player with a Belgian nationality. The award is organised by the Belgian newspaper Het Nieuwsblad.

Winners

Awards by player

Notes

References

Player Of The Year